A copier service provider is used to generate copies of documents. These providers use equipment that can produce high volumes of copies.

Market for copier services  

Copier services are important for businesses as they may not have the staff, time, or equipment to produce a high number of documents within a required time frame.
 
Copier services may be provided on-demand as required by a customer or through contractual arrangements with specified volumes and times. This helps increase stability for both service providers and their customers.

Copies may be produced from paper originals or electronic files.

Copier service companies may also provide related services such as the sending of faxes, and providing digital files from paper originals for use by the customer in applications such as email.
 
Copier service providers may also lease business and office equipment such as fax machines, photocopiers, scanners, and printers, and provide maintenance services for the equipment.

See also
 Printer (publishing)

References

Office work